Bibbi is a given name and surname. Notable people with the name include: 

Bibbi Segerström (1943–2014), Swedish swimmer
Gino Bibbi (1899–1999), Italian engineer and political activist

See also
Bibb (disambiguation)
Bibby